Bethel Theological Seminary is a Christian seminary in Arden Hills, Minnesota in the Minneapolis/St. Paul metropolitan area affiliated with Bethel University (Minnesota). It is accredited by the Association of Theological Schools.  It was initially founded in Chicago, Illinois, in 1871.

History
Rev. John Alexis Edgren, a Baptist minister, former mariner and Civil War veteran originally from Ostana, Sweden, originally founded the school in 1871 as a place for Swedish Baptists to enter the ministry.  Edgren was pastor of the First Swedish Baptist Church of Chicago and worked with the Baptist Theological Union to found the seminary before it moved to Minnesota. The first woman, Elizabeth Johnson, matriculated in 1879. The school moved several times, first from Morgan Park, Illinois, to St. Paul, Minnesota, then to Stomsburg, Nebraska, and then back to Morgan Park in 1888 where it remained until moving permanently to Minnesota in 1914 and becoming part of Bethel University.

Programs offered 
Classes are offered in person and on-line.

 Master of Divinity (M.Div.)
 Doctorate of Ministry (D.Min.)
 M.A. in Children's and Family Ministry
 M.A. in Marriage and Family Therapy
 M.A. in Transformational Leadership
 M.A. (Christian Thought)
 M.A. (Theological Studies)
 M.A. in Ministry*
 M.A. in Mental Health Counseling
 M.A. in Marital and Family Therapy

References

External links
 Official website

Seminaries and theological colleges in Minnesota
Seminaries and theological colleges